Silvia Schmitt  (born 19 April 1962) is a German handball player. She participated at the 1992 Summer Olympics, where the German national team placed fourth.

References 
 Profile at sports-reference.com

1962 births
Living people
People from Kempten im Allgäu
Sportspeople from Swabia (Bavaria)
German female handball players
Olympic handball players of Germany
Olympic handball players of West Germany
Handball players at the 1984 Summer Olympics
Handball players at the 1992 Summer Olympics